Pelatea assidua is a moth of the family Tortricidae. It is found in Taiwan.

References

Olethreutini
Moths of Taiwan